The National Museum of Gitega is the national museum of Burundi. It is located in Gitega and was founded under Belgian colonial rule in 1955. The museum is the largest of Burundi's public museums although its collection is displayed in a single room. In 2014 it averaged 20–50 visitors per week.

Founded in 1955, the museum was intended to preserve artefacts from Burundian folk culture which were declining as a result of modernisation and social change. Its collection includes ethnographic and historical objects originating in the country, including artefacts from the court of the Burundian monarchs. The lack of funds has meant that the museum has made few recent acquisitions.

In 2015, a catalogue of the museum's collection was published with the support of the German Embassy in Burundi entitled Le Patrimoine Burundais: le Musée de Gitega.

References

Further reading 

Museums in Burundi
National museums
Buildings and structures in Gitega
1955 establishments in Ruanda-Urundi
Ethnographic museums in Africa
Gitega
Museums established in 1955
Ruanda-Urundi